This is a list of football clubs in Kolkata. Kolkata is the capital of the Indian state of West Bengal. Located on the east bank of the Hooghly river, it is the principal commercial, cultural, and educational centre of East India. Kolkata differs from other Indian cities by giving importance to association football and other sports. The city is a centre of football activity in India and is home to several current and former top national clubs, such as ATK Mohun Bagan, East Bengal Club, United S.C., Tollygunge Agragami and the Mohammedan Sporting Club. Calcutta Football League, which was started in 1898, is the oldest football league in Asia.

A
Aikya Sammilani
Army Red
Aryan FC
ATK Mohun Bagan

B
Bata SC
Bengal Nagpur Railway FC
Bhratri Sangha FC
Bhawanipore FC
BSS Sporting Club

C
Calcutta Customs
Calcutta FC
Calcutta Police
Calcutta Port Trust
City AC

D

Dalhousie AC
Diamond Harbour FC

E

East Bengal Club 
Eastern Railway FC
Entally Athletic Club

F

Food Corporation of India FC

G
George Telegraph SC

H
Howrah Union

I
Indian Air Force

K

Kalighat Milan Sangha FC
Kidderpore SC
Kumartuli Institute

M
Mohammedan Sporting
Mohun Bagan AC
Measurers Club

P
Peerless SC
Pathachakra FC
Police AC

R
Railway FC
 Rainbow AC

S

Salkia Friends Association
Sovabazar FC
Sonali Sibir AC
Southern Samity
Sporting Union
Sreebhumi FC

T
Taltala Institute
Tollygunge Agragami FC

U
United SC

V
Victoria SC

W
Wari AC
West Bengal Police SC

See also
List of football clubs in West Bengal

References

External links
IFA Clubs
Kolkata Football